"Treehouse of Horror XXIV" is the second episode of the twenty-fifth season of the American animated television series The Simpsons and the 532nd episode of the series. It originally aired on the Fox network in the United States on October 6, 2013. It is the earliest date for Treehouse of Horror to have aired.  The episode was written by Jeff Westbrook and directed by Rob Oliver.

Plot

Opening sequence
The episode's opening, conceived by film director Guillermo del Toro, is a mash-up of horror movies, science fiction films and TV shows, including all of del Toro's own films, ending with Lisa falling through the couch, dressed as Alice from Alice in Wonderland, and getting brainwashed by The Hypnotoad from Futurama, then happening upon a palace room in a send-up of the end of Pan's Labyrinth.

Oh, the Places You'll D'oh!
It is Halloween night in a Dr. Seuss-type take on Springfield. The Simpson children are home with the mumps and unable to go trick-or-treating with the other kids. Once their mother, Marge (in a Catwoman costume that every other woman — and Comic Book Guy, who wore it, not knowing it's Halloween — is wearing), leaves for a costume party, they are visited by The Fat in the Hat, who gives them vaccinations so he can take them out to get candy for them and beer for him. However, while helping the children get their treats, he also takes them on a casual rampage of death and destruction: blowing up the mansion of Mr. Burns (depicted as a buzzard) before killing him and serving his cooked corpse to a homeless shelter; robbing Moe at his own place (where the Halloween buffet their father, Homer, attends is hosted), skinning him and using his flayed skin as a "Thnord"; robbing Apu and forcing him to spend time with his wife and octuplets; killing the Twrinches (Patty and Selma) at their DMV workplace and tossing car licenses to people waiting in line; blowing up town hall while wearing a Guy Fawkes mask; setting animals free from the zoo, and committing "aggravated floop-fluffel-cide", with Ralph Wiggum as one of his victims. Alarmed at these events, the children manage to elude him with the aid of several monstrous animals; a "Three-Humped Gumbammel" (a Barney Gumble-esque camel who is real fast and humble, doesn't take tips and is never a grumbler), a "Krustiferous Krumbull" (a Krusty-esque bull who ends up being beheaded by a matador Sideshow Bob) and, finally, the Spanish-speaking "Bee-Man of Bumble" (a human-sized Bumblebee Man-esque bee with multicolored stripes on his body). However, the Fat is waiting inside for them when they get home and gloats that he will never leave them right before Maggie stabs the Fat in the chest with his own umbrella. The Fat then dies with the words, "I'm frightened of nothing, not even Hell-fires. Just don't let me ever be played by Mike Myers." Marge comes home, unaware of what happened, and the children fake their mumps on the sofa by stuffing the collected candy in their mouths and have turned the Fat into a petticoat-like carpet. The segment then ends with a slide saying that the Fat will eventually return in the fictitious sequel, "The Fat in The Hat Pledges a Frat".

Dead and Shoulders
When Bart ties the string of his box kite around his neck, Arnie Pye flies by and ultimately  hits it, thus causing Bart's head to slice off, afterwards, Bart's head is surgically attached to Lisa's body in order to extend Bart's life and cut Lisa's short. Though the two eventually get along, Bart learns that he can control Lisa's body while she is unconscious and resolves to get rid of her to have total control. Unfortunately, the attempt at a sawmill results in Bart's head being transferred to Selma's body while Lisa's head is grafted onto Krusty.

Freaks, No Geeks
In a circus in the 1930s, the self-serving strongman Homer gets his lover trapeze artist Marge to marry sideshow freak Moe after learning of the emerald ring he inherited from his mother on her death bed. At their wedding reception, the other "freaks" announce that they accept Marge in spite of her being a "normal" outsider (even though Marge claims she is a freak because she has one blue eye and one pale brown eye). After finding Homer attempting to poison Moe's wedding wine glass, an angry Marge sends him away, and Homer is cornered by the freaks with weapons as they advance on him with the intention to mutilate him into a duck humanoid, who is ought to be like them. The scene then cuts to the present, where it is revealed that the whole story was told by this version of Homer of how he met Marge; revealing that she took him back soon after the incident. An epilogue is shown during the credits, revealing that Homer continued his career as the world's strongest duck until his death.

Production

In October 2013, in an interview with Entertainment Weekly, Guillermo del Toro spoke about directing the opening of the episode, saying: "The Simpsons titles are so iconic and yet they've never been riffed in this vein. I really wanted to land the connections between the [show's] set pieces and the titles and some of the most iconic horror movies, and intersperse them with some of my stuff in there for pure joy." He also explained he was inspired by MAD magazine: "They would try to cram so many references in. You as a kid could spend an afternoon on your bed with your magnifying glass going through a frame of MAD magazine and finding all these references to this and that."

Cultural references
The show’s opening sequence contains references to many movies and series, such as  The Birds, Blade II,  Hellboy, American Horror Story, Nosferatu: A Symphony of Horror, The Universal Classic Monsters, and  The Shining.
"Oh, the Places You'll D'oh!" is a spoof of the Dr. Seuss book The Cat in the Hat, while the title is a parody of the title of another Dr. Seuss book, Oh, the Places You'll Go!. A character called the Bore-ax (a spoof of another Seuss character, The Lorax) makes an appearance in the episode, where he is seen promoting consumer goods, despite his message of not harming the environment. Marge goes to attend a Halloween party in a Catwoman costume. Whilst taking the children out to get treats, the Fat blows up the town hall wearing a Guy Fawkes mask, a reference to the 2005 film V for Vendetta. When Homer, as the cat, is killed, he requests that he not be portrayed by actor Mike Myers - a reference to the 2003 Cat in the Hat film. 

"Dead and Shoulders" borrows the premise of the 1972 movie The Thing with Two Heads, which starred Ray Milland and Rosey Grier. At the end of "Dead and Shoulders" and at the beginning of "Freaks, No Geeks", Selma makes Bart help her sing "Mockingbird" from the 1994 comedy Dumb and Dumber. It is also implied that Lisa is a fan of the My Little Pony: Friendship Is Magic character Rainbow Dash. She talks in her sleep saying "Rainbow, oh Rainbow!", to which Bart responds "Oh no, not the pony dream again!". 

"Freaks, No Geeks" is a parody of the 1932 horror film Freaks. At the end of the third story, a mutilated duck creature Homer is seen telling his children that was how he met their mother, which leads into the theme song from the series How I Met Your Mother.

Reception
The episode as a whole received generally positive reviews, while Del Toro's opening sequence was critically acclaimed. David Hinckley of the New York Daily News gave "Treehouse of Horror XXIV" three stars out of five, writing that "'Treehouse of Horrors' remains an honorable tradition, and if nothing else, it reminds fans that they don't have to wait for South Park to get some good old-fashioned animated mayhem." Dennis Perkins of The A.V. Club gave the episode a B, saying, "After the season-opening Homeland parody storyline in last week's episode and a "Treehouse of Horror" for its second, we have yet to see exactly what this season has going for it as The Simpsons soldiers on for its 25th season, as these premise-heavy episodes haven't left much room for character. Next week will be the real test, but for now, I'll take these first two installments as cause for hope." Tony Sokol of Den of Geek! wrote that the episode was "nearly a classic". He felt the third segment was the best and wrote that "When The Simpsons commit to a joke, they commit." Teresa Lopez of TV Fanatic gave the episode three out of five stars, saying "It was an enjoyable episode, but still, the necessity of scheduling the Halloween special so early makes it hard to get into the spooky spirit of things."

The episode received a 3.0 rating and was watched by a total of 6.42 million people, this made it the most watched show on Animation Domination that night beating American Dad!, Bob's Burgers, and Family Guy.

References

External links

"Treehouse of Horror XXIV" at theSimpsons.com

2013 American television episodes
Dr. Seuss parodies
The Simpsons (season 25) episodes
Treehouse of Horror
Halloween television episodes